The All-Ireland Senior B Hurling Championship of 1986 was the 13th staging of Ireland's secondary hurling knock-out competition.  Kerry won the championship, beating London 3-11 to 1-10 in the final at the Emerald GAA Grounds, Ruislip.

References

 Donegan, Des, The Complete Handbook of Gaelic Games (DBA Publications Limited, 2005).

1986
1986 in hurling